Paul "Cigar" McKinney (January 6, 1925 in Princeton, West Virginia – July 6, 2013) was an American poker player who won a World Series of Poker bracelet at the age of 80.

Poker career 
McKinney, who won the 2005 World Series of Poker $1,000 Seniors No Limit Hold'em event (an event that is open to players who are at least aged 50), became the second-oldest person to win a WSOP event (80; Johnny Moss won the 1988 World Series of Poker $1,500 Ace to Five Draw event on his 81st birthday), on his bio sheet for the World Series of Poker he listed his hobbies as "moonshine, cigars and young women.".  McKinney also finished 9th in the 1998 World Series of Poker.  He has twice also made the final table of the United States Poker Championship, held at the Taj Mahal in Atlantic City, N.J., in 1996 and 1998.

His lifetime tournament winnings exceeded $530,000. His 9 cashes at the WSOP account for $363,030 of those winnings.

World Series of Poker Bracelet

Gambling raid 
McKinney along with 18 other players were arrested on November 2, 2007 in the Colonial Heights community in Kingsport, Tennessee in the raid the police seize $19,900 in cash .

Notes

External links
LaunchPoker.com profile Paul McKinney

1925 births
2013 deaths
American poker players
World Series of Poker bracelet winners
People from Princeton, West Virginia